Inanantona or Inanantonana is a town and commune in Madagascar. It belongs to the district of Betafo, which is a part of Vakinankaratra Region. The population of the commune was estimated to be approximately 16,000 in 2001 commune census.

Only primary schooling is available. The majority 50% of the population of the commune are farmers, while an additional 50% receives their livelihood from raising livestock. The most important crops are rice and bambara groundnut, while other important agricultural products are peanuts, maize and cassava.

References and notes 

Populated places in Vakinankaratra